The Café de Paris was a London nightclub, located in the West End, beside Leicester Square on Coventry Street, Piccadilly. Opened in 1924, it became one of the leading theatre clubs in London. After being hit by a German bomb in 1941, when at least 34 people were killed and around 80 injured, it was closed until 1948.

In December 2020 the club closed down permanently due to the COVID-19 pandemic in the United Kingdom. At the end of 2022 it was announced that the venue would reopen in February 2023 under the new name Lío London.

History
Café de Paris first opened in 1924 and subsequently featured such performers as Dorothy Dandridge, Marlene Dietrich, Harry Gold, Harry Roy, Ken Snakehips Johnson and Maxine Cooper Gomberg. Louise Brooks made history when she worked there in December 1924, introducing the Charleston to London.

Much of the early success of the Café de Paris was due to the visit of the then Prince of Wales who became a regular guest, often dining with notables from high society across Europe. Cole Porter was a regular, as was the Aga Khan.

Second World War
On the outbreak of the Second World War, the venue lowered its entry prices. It became less socially exclusive and attracted a more mixed clientele, including many members of the armed forces on leave.

On 8 March 1941, soon after the start of a performance, two bombs fell down a ventilation shaft into the basement ballroom and exploded in front of the stage. At least 34 people were killed and around 80 injured. The victims included the 26-year-old bandleader Ken "Snakehips" Johnson, his saxophonist Dave "Baba" Williams, other band members, staff and diners.

Confusion caused by bombing related chaos in the West End that night delayed ambulances and rescue services reaching the basement area of the explosion for up to half an hour. Immediate aid came from doctors and nurses who were amongst the guests at the Café de Paris. Reportedly several looters made their way into the blacked-out ballroom area and took jewellery from the dead and injured.

Post-war
The venue did not reopen until 1948 but re-established itself as one of the leading theatre clubs in London, playing host to Judy Garland, Josephine Baker, Frank Sinatra, Ava Gardner, Humphrey Bogart, Lauren Bacall, James Mason, David O. Selznick, Jennifer Jones, Tony Hancock and Grace Kelly. In the 1950s Noël Coward often performed cabaret seasons at the Café de Paris as did Marlene Dietrich.

In the mid-1980's, the Cafe de Paris witnessed one of London most popular nights in London at the times, Les nuits du Mercredi, conceptualised by Anne Pigalle around her French take on cabaret and run by Nick Fry. Among the many personalities attending were David Bowie, Andy Warhol, Tina Turner, Mickey Rourke, George Michael, Steve Strange and many more. many articles were published about this modern remake of Cafe Society.

Later on, hosting scene locations for films including Absolute Beginners and The Krays.

21st century
Brian Stein and his Maxwell's Restaurants Group purchased the venue in 2002.

It was used in the 2006 music video for "I Think We're Alone Now" by Girls Aloud. Today the venue is used regularly for film location, and has been used for scenes in The Queen's Sister (based on the life of Princess Margaret) and in The Edge of Love (based on the life of Dylan Thomas).

The Café de Paris, which hosted regular cabaret shows on Friday and Saturday nights, had a dress code for its club and dining room, which stated:

In December 2020, the venue's parent company Maxwell's Restaurant Group went into liquidation, reporting that they had been impacted by restrictions of the Covid-19 pandemic. In November 2022, it was reported that the venue would reopen in February 2023 under the ownership of the Pacha Group and renamed Lío London.

In media

Literature
The 1941 bombing of the Café de Paris is described in a chapter of The Attenbury Emeralds by Jill Paton Walsh. The bombing and its aftermath have a considerable bearing on the investigation carried out by Lord Peter Wimsey in that book.

The café, and the 1941 bombing, are major plot devices in the 2011 novel Moon Over Soho by Ben Aaronovitch.

Disguised as the Café Madrid, this event is also featured in a scene in The Soldier's Art, Anthony Powell's eighth novel in his A Dance to the Music of Time series, on which several of the characters in the series are killed when "a bomb hit the Madrid full pitch."

There is a passing reference to the air-raid in Barbara Pym's A Few Green Leaves.

The 1941 bombing of the Cafe de Paris features in AJ Pearce's novel Dear Mrs Bird (2018).

The bombing of the Cafe also figures in Kate Quinn's 2021 novel The Rose Code.

Television and film
The Café de Paris and its 1941 bombing are discussed in the episode "Safest Spot in Town" in the BBC 4's Queers, a series of monologues in response to the fiftieth anniversary of the Sexual Offences Act 1967 and are mentioned in the novel Transcription by Kate Atkinson.

The café features in the Edgar Wright film Last Night in Soho.

There is also a passing reference to the cafe in the 5th episode of the 6th season of Downton Abbey.

The cafe was used as the strip club back drop in the 1990 comedy film, King Ralph starring John Goodman and Peter O’Toole.

Theatre
The bombing of the Café de Paris is a main plot point in Matthew Bourne's production of Cinderella set during WW2 in London.  It is the location of the main ball/party at the heart of the fairy tale.  Act 2 begins with the cafe having just been bombed, destroyed and full of dead bodies. Then an Angel (the fairy Godmother equivalent) reverses time and brings the cafe fully to life.

References

External links

Cafe de Paris official website
The Maxwells Group
Guestlist & table booking service for Cafe de Paris

Nightclubs in London
Entertainment companies established in 1924
1924 establishments in England
Music venues completed in 1924